Cryptophis nigrostriatus, also known as the black-striped snake, is a species of venomous snake native to Australia and New Guinea. The specific epithet nigrostriatus (“black-striped”) refers to its body markings.

Description
The snake is slender and grows to an average of about 50 cm in length. The upper body is reddish-brown to pink, with a black, full-length vertebral stripe and dark head.

Behaviour
The species is viviparous, with an average litter size of six.

Distribution and habitat
The species occurs in the southern Western Province of Papua New Guinea, and in Australia from the northern Cape York Peninsula south-eastwards through eastern Queensland to Rockhampton. It inhabits dry woodlands. The type locality is near Rockhampton.

References

 
nigrostriatus
Snakes of Australia
Snakes of New Guinea
Reptiles of Queensland
Taxa named by Gerard Krefft
Reptiles described in 1854